Vietnam Television (abbreviated THVN), sometimes also unofficially known as the National Television, Saigon Television or Channel 9 (THVN9), was one of two national television broadcasters in the South Vietnam from February 7, 1966, until just before the Fall of Saigon on April 29, 1975. It was the first television broadcaster in whole Vietnam.

THVN9 was operated by the Vietnamese Bureau of Television, part of the General Department of Radio, Television, and Cinema in the Ministry of Propaganda. Vietnam Television broadcast from the capital Saigon on channel 9 (4.5 MHz) in FCC-standard black and white. However, from 1972, all important events were broadcast in color as standard.

The other national broadcaster was the English-language Armed Forces Vietnam Network or NWB-TV on channel 11. Both channels used an airborne transmission relay system from airplanes flying at the high altitudes, called Stratovision, as part of Operation Blue Eagle.

History

Vietnam Television Station (THVN) was established in 1965; its first broadcast was on February 7, 1966, at 6:58 pm, and the last one was at 11:58 pm on April 29, 1975. The first broadcast recorded images of Prime Minister Nguyễn Cao Kỳ and US ambassador Cabot Lodge. Initially lasting for an hour, the duration was later increased to two hours. On October 25, 1966, THVN's first above-ground establishment was finished.

THVN was established at the same time as AFRTS (Armed Forces Radio Television Service), which was renamed as AFVN (Armed Forces Vietnam Network) in 1967. THVN broadcast on band 9, while AFVN on frequency band 11. AFVN broadcast the landing of Neil Armstrong on the Moon in 1969 for audiences in South Vietnam.

Recording was first performed at the National Cinema Center No. 9 on Thi Sach Street. In 1967, THVN was split into 2 separate departments - Cinema and Television. THVN's headquarter was moved to 9 Hồng Thập Tự Avenue (now Nguyen Thi Minh Khai Street) - which later became the headquarter of the current Ho Chi Minh City Television.

Historical events in early 1975 were also broadcast by Saigon Television. The chaotic and bloody evacuation from the Central Highlands to Tuy Hoa along Highway 7, dubbed as the "Convoy of Tears" was broadcast on television - causing more terror for the people in the South. This was followed by a live broadcast of the resignation speech of President Nguyễn Văn Thiệu on the evening of April 21, 1975.

On April 30, the TV crew of THVN9 went to the Independence Palace to broadcast for President Dương Văn Minh, but did not because around 7 am, Minh told everyone to leave. A few hours later, the regime of the Republic of Vietnam ended.

The last broadcast of THVN9 was from 18:45 to 22:45 on April 29, 1975, the day before the Fall of Saigon. After the Fall of Saigon, THVN9 was handed over to the Viet Cong. Vietnam Television's final programming aired the evening of April 29, 1975.

The next day, the station was reconstituted as Saigon Liberation Television Station (SGTV) with a live broadcast of South Vietnamese President Dương Văn Minh's surrender. However, SGTV became Ho Chi Minh City Television on May 1, 1975. The first broadcast (on channel HTV9 nowadays) was about the declaration of surrender by Dương Văn Minh.

On July 2, 1976, THVN was renamed as Ho Chi Minh City Television (HTV).

Governance and corporate structure

Board
Executive committee : LC Đỗ Việt (first director), FD Đỗ Tiến Đức (second director), Lê Hoàng Hoa (first deputy director and executive producer)...
Operational divisions : Hoàng Trọng (music producer), Hoàng Thái (camera operator), Robert C. Gassert (technical advisor), Wyndham P. Duncan (sound advisor), Hoàng Thị Lệ Hợp (newsreader), Mai Thy (newsreader), Tuyết Mai (newsreader), Mai Liên (newsreader), Nguyễn Đình Khánh (newsreader), Nguyễn Văn Đông, Nguyễn Thế Bảo, Trần Văn Trạch (MC), Ngọc Phu (MC)...
Co-operators : Hoàng Thi Thơ, Hồ Điệp, Thẩm Thúy Hằng, La Thoại Tân, Kim Cương, Túy Hồng, Tùng Lâm, Khả Năng, Thanh Việt, Trần Thiện Thanh, Mai Lệ Huyền, Phạm Duy, Tâm Phan, Trần Quang, Hùng Cường, Bạch Tuyết, Trường Kỳ, Nam Lộc, Nguyễn Thành Châu, Phùng Há, Thanh Nga, Túy Hoa, Thành Được, Út Bạch Lan, Minh Vương, Lệ Thủy, Thanh Sang, Út Trà Ôn, Diệp Lang, Phượng Liên, Kiều Chinh, Dũng Thanh Lâm, Văn Chung, Thanh Lan, Thanh Tuyền, Chế Linh, Bạch Lan Hương, Tuyết Lan, Quốc Dũng, Kiểu Hạnh, Mộng Tuyền, Dũng Thanh Lâm, Huỳnh Thanh Trà, Phương Hồng Quế, Phương Hồng Hạnh, Phương Đại, Du Tử Lê, Khánh Ly, Trịnh Công Sơn...

Services

List of featured programmes broadcast by the THVN9 :

00 giờ (00 o'clock entertainment show) by Thẩm Thúy Hằng
15 phút chuyện vui (15 minutes for funny stories) by La Thoại Tân
Ban thiếu nhi Gió Khơi (Offshore Wind band) by Bùi Duy Tâm & Hùng Lân
Ban Tiếng Tơ Đồng (Sound-of-Musical-Instrument band) by Hoàng Trọng
Ban Tuổi Xanh (Green Age band) by Kiều Hạnh
Chương trình ca nhạc thiếu nhi Nguyễn Đức (Nguyen Duc's show)
Chương trình thiếu nhi Xuân Phát (Xuan Phat's show) by Xuân Phát
Đố vui để học (Funny charades for study) by Vũ Khắc Khoan (producer), Đinh Ngọc Mô (announcer) and Cao Thanh Tùng (announcer)
Giác ngộ (Awakening) by Unified Buddhist Church of Vietnam
Giờ kịch Kim Cương (Kim Cuong's drama show)
Giờ kịch Sống (Life's drama show) by Túy Hồng
Giờ kịch Thẩm Thúy Hằng (Tham Thuy Hang's drama show)
Giờ kịch Vũ Đức Duy (Vu Duc Duy's drama show)
Giờ Mai Lệ Huyền (Mai Le Huyen's show)
Giờ nhạc trẻ (Young Music's show) by Trường Kỳ & Nam Lộc
Hoa bách hợp (Fleur-de-lys) by Vietnamese Scout Association
Hoa hồng xám (Grey Roses's drama show) by Tâm Phan
Hoàng Thi Thơ (Hoang Thi Tho's show)
Hoa thế hệ (Flowers from our generation)
Nhóm Tiếng Hát Đôi Mươi (Singing-of-Age-Twenty's show) by Trần Thiện Thanh
Phúc âm (Gospel's hour) by Christian and Missionary Alliance of Vietnam
Tạp lục Tùng Lâm (Tung Lam's vaudeville) / Tiếu vương hội (Comedy kings) by Tùng Lâm
Thép súng (For Soldiers)
Thế giới trẻ em (World of children) by Lê Văn Khoa
Thể thao (Sport's hour)
Tiếng chuông chùa (Bell ring from the pagoda) by Unified Buddhist Church of Vietnam
Tuồng cải lương (Reformed theater's hour)
Tuyển lựa ca sĩ (Selection of singers)
Truyền hình Đắc Lộ (Alexandre de Rhodes's hour) by Roman Catholic Archdiocese of Saigon
[...]

Nearby permanent programmes, THVN9's directorate permitted that all of South Vietnames citizens have the right to "bidding" (đấu thầu) for buying the TV signal. Normally including as officials, scholars, especially artists (vocalists, actors...). Languages included Vietnamese (primarily), Chinese, French, English, Khmer and Montagnard.

In divided Vietnam, the highlight of Vietnamese Catholicism and the Fátima messages was the visit of one of a few official statues of Our Lady of Fátima to South Vietnam in 1965. Originally scheduled for a three-month visit, this particular statue came from the Blue Army chapter in Australia and ended up traveling the country until 1967. It was known as the “immaculate heart” statue because it puts her heart on the outside. This event was THVN (at the trial phase) lively recorded.

Nearby the media, THVN9 Network also sponsored the Young Music Festival and Vietnam Film Day. During the 1970s, Young Music Festival was the biggest cultural event in Asia and Oceania. It has attracted many vocalists and bands from South Vietnam, Philippines, Hong Kong, Taiwan, Japan, South Korea, Australia, New Zealand and even the United States. Their purpose was an anti-war exhortation and a supporting peace for whole world.

27 April 1971, THVN9 has lively reported Taiwanese star songstress Teresa Teng's tour. She performed at Lệ Thanh Theatre, Bát Đạt Grand Hotel in capital Saigon during a month, then visited the Western Delta. Teng performed first hit No of composer Nguyễn Ánh 9 by Japanese and Mandarin language.

Cultural significance

Inheritances

After 30 April 1975, total of videotapes were transferred to People's Army of Vietnam's Archives at No. 83 Lý Nam Đế street in Hanoi. However, some still existed by collectors. Many other copytapes were held by governments as Australia, Canada, Denmark (Danish Vietnamese Association), France (AFP), West Germany, Hong Kong, India, Japan, New Zealand, Philippines, South Korea (KBS), Taiwan, Thailand, United Kingdom (BBC), United States (AP). Besides, many among them was still used by modern Vietnamese filmmakers to do propaganda documentary ones.

From 2010, journalist Lê Quang Thanh Tâm has begun sharing some THVN9 tapes to Facebook and YouTube. Although clause as old reports of singers and actors. In 2020, he has ever litigated Asia Entertainment Inc. (Trung tâm Asia) for a copyright theft when they registered as an owner on YouTube channel with these tapes.

In Los Angeles during the 1980s, some former technicians re-established THVN9 to broadcast news and dramas by Vietnamese language for service the Vietnamese American community. They registered a trademark as the Abroad-THVN Television Network to differentiate former THVN9 or Domestic-THVN.

Influences
According to MA Thành Lộc (born in 1961) about his childhood, father (PA Thành Tôn) often used a Vespa scooter for carrying his children to Saigonese avenue everynight. Because every South Vietnamese squares have always a television set for service freely poor people. "A popular and familiar habit ; a nice memory of my love city" – said him.

During the Vietnam War in North Vietnam's localities, every municipal families who want to buy radio receivers and TV sets must registered at the police office of their ward or county. Moreover, areas as countryside, frontier and especially 17th parallel were forbidden. Illegal cases could came the jail or revamped learned many years. So this enactment was like a resistance for all efforts of their enemy. Or which was called in North Vietnamese documents as the "propagandas of our enemies" (tuyên truyền của thế lực thù địch).

However, by the recall of author Vương Trí Nhàn to RFI (Thụy Khuê's voice programme) about 2000s, many cultural & arts organizations, military and security agencies in Hanoi be still licensed to observe South Vietnamese radio and television, especially THVN9. By songstress Ái Vân, she knew singing voice of Út Trà Ôn, Ngọc Giàu, Lệ Thủy, Út Bạch Lan, Thành Được... from the 1960s when was a post-war.

Notes

References

See also

Hue Television (Đài Truyền-hình Huế, THH1)
Quynhon Television (Đài Truyền-hình Quy-nhơn, THQN3)
Nhatrang Television (Đài Truyền-hình Nha-trang, THNT5)
Cantho Television (Đài Truyền-hình Cần-thơ, THCT7)
Radio Vietnam
Ho Chi Minh City Television
Vietnam Television
Media in South Vietnam

Further reading

Documents
One time of YoungMusic : Trường Kỳ's memoir
Lê Quang Thanh Tâm, Điện ảnh miền Nam trôi theo dòng lịch sử, Hochiminh City Culture & Arts Publishing House, Saigon, 2015
Phạm Công Luận, Hồi ức, sưu khảo, ghi chép về văn hóa Sài Gòn, Phuongnam Books & Thegioi Publishing House, Saigon, 2016-2022

External links
Kí-ức truyền-hình Việtnam băng-tần 9
Môi son Julie : Vũ trường tango đèn màu
Sài Gòn - những địa chỉ nổi tiếng trước và sau 1975
Hình ảnh so sánh đường Sài Gòn xưa và nay
Catinat/Tự Do - con đường phồn hoa
Catinat/Tự Do và nếp sống Sàigòn xưa qua con đường lâu đời nhất